This is a list of the theatrical works of the nineteenth-century British playwright James Robinson Planché.

Key

Works

References

Bibliographies by writer
James Planche bibliography
Bibliographies of British writers
Dramatist and playwright bibliographies